The Southeast Metro Manila Expressway (SEMME), also known as Skyway Stage 4, C-6 Expressway and formerly as Metro Manila Expressway, is an under construction  tolled expressway running across eastern Metro Manila and western Rizal. The expressway will help decongest the existing roadways across Metro Manila, such as EDSA and Circumferential Road 5. The expressway is part of the larger C-6 Expressway project.

The expressway will begin at the Skyway near FTI (now Arca South), Taguig, and will end at the Batasang Pambansa Complex in Quezon City. It will also connect to the North Luzon Expressway (NLEx) in Balagtas, Bulacan.

Groundbreaking ceremony of the project was held on January 8, 2018.

The entire expressway will be a spur component of Expressway 2 (E2) of the Philippine expressway network.

Future exits

References 

Roads in Rizal